Hublersburg is an unincorporated community and census-designated place in Walker Township, Centre County, Pennsylvania, United States. As of the 2010 census, the population was 104 residents. The founder of Hublersburg was Jacob Hubler.

Demographics

References

Census-designated places in Centre County, Pennsylvania
Census-designated places in Pennsylvania

p